is a Japanese ceramics company. It primarily produces insulators but also produces other products, especially ceramic products.  NGK is headquartered in Tokyo (Marunouchi Bldg. 25F, 2-4-1, Marunouchi, Chiyoda-ku, Tokyo 100–6325) and is listed on the Nikkei 225, which is an index of the Tokyo Stock Exchange. It is also listed in the Osaka Securities Exchange, the Nagoya Stock Exchange, and the Sapporo Securities Exchange all under listing code 5333. NGK stands for Nippon (Japan) Gaishi (insulator) Kaisha (company).

Sodium-sulfur batteries
NGK Insulators is known-worldwide for the development of sodium-sulfur batteries in cooperation with TEPCO. NGK's NaS battery systems are being used worldwide, primarily in Japan and the United States.

NGK Insulators markets its NaS batteries for use as grid storage (especially for use in conjunction with renewable energy sources such as wind and solar). The battery systems can be used for both peak shaving, load leveling, emissions reductions, and as emergency power supplies. The "typical system" (as defined by NGK) is composed of 40 50-kW units for a total system capacity of 12,000 kWh.

NGK's systems are currently used worldwide, both as grid storage and as a supplement to wind and solar installations. System capacities range from 1.5 to 34 MW.

See also
 NGK
 Tokyo Electric Power Company

References

External links 

Ceramics manufacturers of Japan
Companies listed on the Tokyo Stock Exchange
Manufacturing companies based in Nagoya